Avinguda Diagonal (in Spanish Avenida Diagonal) is the name of one of Barcelona's broadest and most important avenues. It cuts the city in two, diagonally with respect to the grid pattern of the surrounding streets, hence the name.

It was originally projected by engineer and urban planner Ildefons Cerdà as one of the city's wide avenues, which along with Avinguda Meridiana would cut the rationalist grid he designed for l'Eixample (Catalan for extension). Both would meet at Plaça de les Glòries Catalanes, which Cerdà envisioned as the new city centre. However, Plaça Catalunya, equally a new addition to the city of Barcelona, and connecting Ciutat Vella and Eixample, and therefore occupying a more privileged position in the urban area, would finally become the centre. Avinguda Diagonal remains to this day a much-transited avenue and many companies and hotels use it as a privileged location, as can be seen in its architecture.

The avenue starts in the Les Corts district on the western edge of the city and runs to the Sant Martí district on the eastern edge. To its west, it connects with the Lleida-Madrid highway and Ronda de Dalt in the neighbouring municipality of Esplugues de Llobregat. To its east, it meets the Ronda del Litoral on the border with the municipality of Sant Adrià de Besòs.

Name
The different regimes that held power in Catalonia and Spain during the 20th century sought to change the city's street names, and Avinguda Diagonal was permitted no exception. It has been known under the following names:
 Gran Via Diagonal – original name which Ildefons Cerdà and Víctor Balaguer intended to call the avenue.
 Avinguda d'Argüelles – 1891. Named after Agustín Argüelles (1776–1844).
 Avinguda de la Nacionalitat Catalana – 1922. Mancomunitat de Catalunya, (in English, Commonwealth of Catalonia).
 Avenida de Alfonso XIII −1924. During Miguel Primo de Rivera's dictatorship, named after King Alfonso XIII.
 Avinguda del Catorze d'Abril – 1931. Second Spanish Republic (1931–1939).
 Gran Vía Diagonal – 1939, provisional name imposed the day after the Fascist capture of Barcelona as an attempt to eliminate references to the Republic.
 Avenida del Generalísimo Francisco Franco – 1939. During the authoritarian regime of Francisco Franco.
 Avinguda Diagonal – Its current name, adopted following the restoration of democracy in 1979.

The name "Diagonal" has always prevailed in popular usage.

History

Early history
Ildefons Cerdà's so-called Pla Cerdà was not totally successful in transforming Barcelona's urban reality, as only parts of it were finally approved. The construction of Avinguda Diagonal is one of the  projects it entailed that became reality, when a Royal Decree from Queen Isabella II of Spain and Leopoldo O'Donnell's Spanish government in Madrid allowed him to start the construction of the avenue in 1859. The city council of Barcelona had previously requested the approval of Antoni Rovira i Trias's alternative project instead, which had been rejected.

After the completion of its central section, from the current Plaça de Francesc Macià towards Glòries, it soon became one of Barcelona's most popular avenues and an ideal place for the Catalan aristocrats and bourgeoisie to exhibit their carriages. Francesc Cambó, leader of Lliga Regionalista proposed the construction of a new palace for the then monarch Alfonso XIII in 1919 (the royal palace in Ciutat Vella had been destroyed in the fire of 1875).

Recent history
Avinguda Diagonal suffered several attacks by the Basque separatist organisation ETA in 2000. On 2 November, a car bomb exploded injuring a security officer and a municipal officer. A few days later, on 21 November, a car used by the killers of Ernest Lluch exploded in the middle of the avenue. On 20 December a municipal officer was shot dead.

Four venues in the area hosted competitions for the 1992 Summer Olympics.

During 2010, Diagonal reform proposals were on the headlines, as the Barcelona city council had plans to make the tram cross the whole avenue. A popular consultation (the word referendum being banned by Spanish law) was scheduled for May 2010 between two reform proposals, the so-called rambla or boulevard. It resulted in a big political failure for the city mayor, Jordi Hereu. There was a bare participation of 12% of potential voters, and about 80% voted for the third option none of the former two, that is, against any change.

Buildings and places of interest

Architecture
Casa del Baró de Quadras (Museu de la Música) – designed by Josep Puig i Cadafalch (1904–1906)
Casa Comalat – designed by Salvador Valeri i Pupurull (1906–1911)
Església del Carme – designed by Josep Domènech i Estapà, neo-Byzantine style (1909)
Casa Serra – also designed by Josep Puig i Cadafalch, became a school.
Casa de Terrades, also known as Casa de les Punxes – Eixample's widest building, designed by Puig i Cadafalch (1903–1905)
ME Barcelona hotel, designed by Dominique Perrault (2007).
Palau Pérez Samanillo
Casa Sayrach – (1918)
Palau Reial de Pedralbes (1921), built for Alfonso XIII of Spain and its gardens. (1924).
Torre Agbar – designed by Jean Nouvel, next to Plaça de les Glòries Catalanes (2005).
La Caixa Headquarters
Disseny Hub Barcelona

Shopping centres
L'Illa.
El Corte Inglés Avinguda Diagonal
El Corte Inglés Francesc Macià
Diagonal Mar
Glòries
Pedralbes Centre

Cinemas
CINESA Diagonal Mar
Boliche
CINESA Diagonal
Glòries Multicines

Education
Avinguda Diagonal is also home to several schools of both Universitat de Barcelona (UB) and Universitat Politècnica de Catalunya, in the area that is commonly known as Zona Universitària.

The following UB faculties and schools are located on the avenue:
Biology (Av. Diagonal, 645)
Chemical Engineering (Av. Diagonal, 647)
Chemistry (Av. Diagonal, 647)
Business school (Av. Diagonal, 696)
Economics (Av. Diagonal, 690)
Law (Av. Diagonal, 684)
Materials Engineering (Av. Diagonal, 647)
Physics (Av. Diagonal, 647)

Transport

Metro
The avenue is served by a number of metro stations:
Zona Universitària (L3, L9)
Palau Reial (L3)
Maria Cristina (L3)
Diagonal (L3, L5) – In and around Passeig de Gràcia.
Provença (L6, L7) – In Carrer Provença, linked with Diagonal station.
Verdaguer (L4, L5) – In Plaça Verdaguer
Glòries (L1) – in Plaça de les Glòries Catalanes.
Selva de Mar (L4).
El Maresme Fòrum (L4).

Tram

Trambaix
Zona Universitària (T1, T2, T3)
Palau Reial (T1, T2, T3)
Maria Cristina (T1, T2, T3)
Numància (T1, T2, T3)
L'Illa (T1, T2, T3)
Francesc Macià (T1, T2, T3)
Trambesòs
Glòries (T4, T5)
Ca L'Aranyó (T4)
Pere IV (T4)
Fluvià (T4)
Selva de Mar (T4)
El Maresme (T4)
Fòrum (T4)

See also
Diagonal metro station
Eixample, List of streets in Eixample
Modernisme, Noucentisme, Art Nouveau.
Ildefons Cerdà and his Pla Cerdà, influenced by utopian socialism
History of Barcelona
History of Catalonia
History of Spain
2004 Universal Forum of Cultures

 Street names in Barcelona
 Urban planning of Barcelona

References

Sources
 ALBAREDA, Joaquim, GUÀRDIA, Manel i altres. Enciclopèdia de Barcelona, Gran Enciclopèdia Catalana, Barcelona, 2006.

External links
Article on Avinguda Diagonal by journalist Lluís Permanyer
Casa de les Punxes
Avinguda Diagonal at the tourism site of the city council.
The new tile of Diagonal in Barcelona.

 
Venues of the 1992 Summer Olympics
Streets in Barcelona
Les Corts (district)
Eixample
Sant Martí (district)
Shopping districts and streets in Catalonia
Tourist attractions in Barcelona